Are You Listening! (Original title in Bengali: শুনতে কি পাও!), is a Bangladeshi fiction-non-fiction film written-directed by Kamar Ahmad Simon and produced by Sara Afreen. The "OPENING FILM" of Open Doors Screening at LOCARNO Film Festival, 'Are You Listening!' has been invited to more than 40 International Festivals including "OFFICIAL SELECTION" of 25th IDFA, the largest documentary festival of the world and "OPENING FILM" of 55th Dok Leipzig, the oldest documentary festival. It was also exhibited on special occasions of Conference of Youth (COY) in Paris, Royal Anthropological Institute (RAI) London, Cinema Louxor in Paris, Stadkino Basel in Switzerland and many more.

In a rare move as a fiction-non-fiction, it was released in theatre in Bangladesh on 21 February 2014 in Bashundhara Star Cineplex and successfully ran for four weeks. 
In 2015, the film was awarded with Bangladesh National Film Award as the Best Feature (Non-fiction) handed over by Sheikh Hasina, Prime Minister of People's Republic of Bangladesh.
 
Written, directed and also filmed by Kamar over a span of 20 months living in a remote coastal village (Sundarbans) of Bangladesh, it is an observational cinema inspired in cinéma vérité or direct cinema style, a genre almost missing until now in Bangladesh.

Development
In December 2009, director Kamar Ahmad Simon started traveling the coastal areas of Bangladesh, approximately 200-kilometer stretch from Bhola to Shatkhira on local boat in three months span on and off, completely unplanned. Before his journey, a tidal surge swept away the coasts of Bangladesh. On these trips he made several stops on different locations and engaged with local debates for hours on tea-chats. On coming back to Dhaka, Kamar extracted out of these informal-chats forming a script based on these very characters and locations that led him go back to them again and again. Later in this phase, for script development and production, the film won two competitive Grant Awards from Jan Vrijman Fund in 2010. Kamar also participated in the IDFA Academy Summer School in August same year to develop the idea further, and in 2011 the film idea was awarded as the Best Pitch in Asian Forum for Documentary held in Kolkata.

Production
Initially the film crew was mostly formed of young film enthusiasts due to financing constraints, and the nature of montage the director envisioned. The location was an added challenge since it had no access to basic utilities such as water, electricity or food and the production was executed in a guerrilla warfare style. Sometimes the shooting was planned for a week but wrapped in three days, and sometimes the schedule extended even for three weeks without any pre-planning.

The director was obsessed with his own vision of making the film, and eventually failed to hold-up the team of the young enthusiasts. But the director's adamancy paid off when locals kind of understood the director more than his team, and almost the entire village stood up lending a hand in any way they could support the production. Volunteers from the village were then groomed to assist in the production handling the logistics. The production continued for 20 months with a series of tours made in every other week or month.
In between the shooting, the director attempted to contact editors to have an understanding of the film coming up. But the traditional editors from local industry paid less interest due to lack of understanding of Cinema Verite style. Later Kamar came across Saikat Sekharswar Ray, an editor based in Kolkata and a faculty of Satyajit Ray Film and Television Institute and was very impressed with his work. Saikat liked the rush but agreed to edit given that he will work with the entire 170 hours of rush, something that Kamar failed to make the local Bangladeshi editors agree.

The editing was scheduled to start in August 2011, but was halted abruptly with a tragic road accident when Tareque Masud (1956 – 2011), the finest of filmmakers that Bangladesh has produced till date (The Clay Bird, Cannes 2002, Director's Fortnight, FIEPRESCI Award, Best Film), was killed. Tareque was Kamar's mentor and had a great influence on his film-philosophy. The editing started again in February 2012 when it was invited along with eight other projects in Editing Lab of Berlin Talent Campus, Berlinale 2012. Yet the post-production greatly suffered due to funding crisis until again it won the competitive Grant Award from Visions Sud Est, Switzerland for post-production in 2012.

Crew
 Kamar Ahmad Simon (Writer, Director & Cinematographer)
 Sara Afreen (Producer)
 Saikat Sekhareswar Ray (Editor)
 Sukanta Majumdar (Sound Editor & Designer)

Release
The film had its world premiere at the 55th DOK Leipzig in Germany as the ‘Curtain-Opener’ of the festival on 29 October 2012. In a rare move as a documentary, it was released in Bangladesh on 21 February 2014 in Bashundhara Star Cineplex and successfully ran for four weeks. Before that Muktir Gaan by Tareque Masud was the only documentary that was released in theater in Bangladesh after one decade of its making and ran a week.

Reception
The Director of the European Documentary Network (EDN) and Danish film critic Tue Steen Müller wrote about the film in his blog,
A classic humanistic, cinematically brilliant work…brings back memories of the Apu-trilogy of Satyajit Ray.

The 25th International Documentary Film Festival Amsterdam (IDFA) introduced the film as,
A gorgeously shot observational documentary… filming from an unusually low camera angle…

The Jury awarding the ‘Grand Prix’ in the main international competition section of 35th Cinéma du Réel in Paris cited,
With patience and intelligence in a hostile environment Kamar knew how to stay at the good distance of the people...he filmed to build a humanist movie...in the tradition of the feature-length documentary narratives 'Are You Listening!' is a visual symphony and an ode to life.

Dubai based film programmer and critic Özge Calafato wrote in the 2013 spring edition of European documentary magazine, the quarterly DOX, 
Strong political content with a distinct artistic vision…doesn't want to be confined to any strict interpretation of the genre.

One of the most popular Bengali newspaper Prothom Alo, with the largest Bangladeshi readership, published the news of winning ‘Grand Prix’ in 35th Cinéma du Réel 2013 in Paris in highlighted box in back page as a national achievement news.

Also, the 15th years anniversary special publication, a coffee table book on Bangladesh's achievement of 15 years between 1998 and 2013’, Prothom Alo mentioned two films – ‘Shunte Ki Pao!’ (Are You Listening!) and Matir Moina (The Clay Bird) by Kamar's mentor Tareque Masud.

Reviews
 Shahaduzzaman, Daily Prothom Alo
 Fahmidul Haque, banglanews24.com
 Anis Pervez, The Daily Star
 Gias Uddin Selim, Daily Samakal
 Jahid Reza Noor, Daily Prothom Alo
 Mahmud Didar, Daily Janakantha

Awards and accolades

 Best Feature for Best Feature-Length Non-fiction, Bangladesh National Film Award 2013
 Golden Conch for Best Feature-Length Documentary, Mumbai International Film Festival (MIFF) 2014, India
 Best Cinematography, Mumbai International Film Festival (MIFF) 2014, India
 Audience Choice Award, Seattle South Asian Film Festival (SSAFF) 2014, Seattle, USA
 Grand Prix for Best Feature-Length Documentary, 35th Cinéma du Réel 2013, France
 Jury Award, Film South Asia 2013, Nepal
 Opening Night Film, 55th Dok-Leipzig, Germany 2012
 Grant Award: Distribution, Movies That Matter 2013, Netherlands
 Editing Lab Project, Campus Studio/ Berlinale 2012, Germany
 Grant Award: Post-production, Visions Sud Est 2011, Switzerland
 Best Pitch, DocedgeKolkata, Asian Forum for Documentary 2011, India
 Grant Award: Script, Jan Vrijman Fund (JVF/ IDFA) 2010, Netherlands
 Grant Award: Production, Jan Vrijman Fund (JVF/ IDFA) 2010, Netherlands

Screening
Are You Listening!' has been invited to more than 40 International Festivals including "OFFICIAL SELECTION" of 25th IDFA, the largest documentary festival of the world and "OPENING FILM" of 55th Dok Leipzig. It was also exhibited on special occasions of Conference of Youth (COY) in Paris, Royal Anthropological Institute (RAI) London, Cinema Louxor in Paris, Stadkino Basel in Switzerland and many more.

References

External links
 Are You Listening! on Amazon Video
 Are You Listening! on Vimeo
 Are You Listening! on Google Play Movies & TV
 Are You Listening! on iTunes Store 

 
 Are You Listening! on YouTube

2012 films
2012 documentary films
Bengali-language Bangladeshi films
Bangladeshi documentary films
2010s Bengali-language films